Mihai Borș (born 11 January 1951) is a Romanian gymnast. He competed in eight events at the 1976 Summer Olympics.

References

1951 births
Living people
Romanian male artistic gymnasts
Olympic gymnasts of Romania
Gymnasts at the 1976 Summer Olympics
Gymnasts from Bucharest